Rülzheim is a municipality in the district of Germersheim, in Rhineland-Palatinate, Germany. It is situated approximately 10 km south-west of Germersheim.

Rülzheim is the seat of the Verbandsgemeinde ("collective municipality") Rülzheim. Rülzheim station is on Schifferstadt–Wörth railway and is served by the Karlsruhe Stadtbahn.

References

Germersheim (district)